Linda Lavin (born October 15, 1937) is an American actress and singer. She is known for playing the title character in the sitcom Alice and for her stage performances, both on and off-Broadway. 

After acting as a child, Lavin joined the Compass Players in the late 1950s. She began appearing on Broadway in the 1960s, earning notice in It's a Bird...It's a Plane...It's Superman in 1966 and receiving her first Tony Award nomination for Last of the Red Hot Lovers in 1970. She moved to Hollywood in 1973 and began to work on television, making recurring appearances on the sitcom Barney Miller before landing the title role on the hit comedy Alice, which ran from 1976 to 1985. She appeared in many telefilms and later she appeared in other TV works. She has also played roles in several feature films. 

In 1987, she returned to Broadway, starring in Broadway Bound (winning a Tony Award), Gypsy (1990), The Sisters Rosensweig (1993), The Diary of Anne Frank (1997–1998) and The Tale of the Allergist's Wife (2000–2001), among others. In 2010, she appeared as Ruth Steiner in Collected Stories, garnering her fifth Tony nomination. She starred in NBC's short-lived sitcom Sean Saves the World as Lorna and the CBS sitcom 9JKL.  She also starred in the CBS sitcom B Positive.

Early life and career 
Lavin was born in Portland, Maine, the daughter of David Joseph Lavin, a businessman, and Lucille (née Potter), an opera singer. The Lavin family were active members of the local Jewish community. Both sets of grandparents, Simon and Jessie Lavin and Harry and Esther Potter, emigrated from Russia. Her family was musically talented, and Lavin has been onstage since the age of five. She studied acting at HB Studio in New York City. She attended Waynflete School before enrolling in the College of William & Mary. While at William and Mary, she performed with the William and Mary Theater in many productions directed by long-time Professor Howard Scammon. In the summer of 1958, she played one of the leads in The Common Glory, an outdoor drama written by Pulitzer-Prize winning playwright Paul Green and staged at an amphitheater on campus. Upon her graduation from William and Mary, she had already received her Actors' Equity Association card. She was a member of the Compass Players in the late 1950s. By the early 1960s, Lavin had appeared in several Broadway shows and appeared on the 1966 cast recordings of The Mad Show performing Stephen Sondheim's "The Boy From...". From It's a Bird...It's a Plane...It's Superman, one of her numbers, "You've Got Possibilities", was the album's best-received song and was called "The one memorable song...flirty, syncopated" by the Dallas Observer.

Career

Television and film 
In 1967, Lavin made an appearance as Gloria Thorpe in a television version of the baseball musical Damn Yankees with Phil Silvers. In 1969, Lavin married actor Ron Leibman, and by 1973, the couple had arrived in Hollywood, California. After various guest appearances on episodic television series such as The Nurses, Rhoda, Harry O and Kaz, Lavin landed a recurring role as Detective Janice Wentworth on Barney Miller during the first and second seasons (1975–1976).

She left Barney Miller to star in the lead role in Alice. The show was a popular hit for CBS and ran from 1976 to 1985. The series was based on the Martin Scorsese-directed Ellen Burstyn film Alice Doesn't Live Here Anymore. Lavin portrayed Alice Hyatt, a waitress and singer, the character that Burstyn had played. Lavin performed the series' theme song, "There's a New Girl in Town," which was written by David Shire and Alan and Marilyn Bergman and was updated for each of the first six seasons. During the series' nine-season run, Lavin earned two Golden Globe Awards and a Primetime Emmy Award nomination, and gained experience directing, especially during the later seasons. Lavin also played a dual role in Alice, as Debbie Walden, the wizened and former landlady of the character Vera Louise Gorman-Novak. Lavin also made numerous television appearances outside of Alice, including hosting her own holiday special for CBS, Linda in Wonderland (1980). She acted in two sitcoms, Room for Two (1992–93) and 1998's Conrad Bloom. In Room for Two, she played a mother who moved in with her daughter, played by Patricia Heaton, who has a show on a local television station. The daughter gives Lavin's character her own segment, called Just a Thought, at the end of her program.

After working in theatre for many years, Lavin was cast in the NBC television sitcom Sean Saves the World (2013–14) playing Sean Hayes' pushy, meddling mother Lorna. The Los Angeles Times interviewer noted: "A highlight of the show is the wonderful chemistry between Lavin and Hayes, who exchange repartee and quips with breezy ease. And the cast seems smitten with her."

She made numerous television guest appearances, including roles on The Muppet Show (1979), Law & Order: Criminal Intent, The O.C., Touched by an Angel (1999) and HBO's The Sopranos (2002).

She also appeared in many telefilms between 1967 and 1998, including: Damn Yankees!, Sadbird, The Morning After, Jerry, Like Mom, Like Me, The $5.20 an Hour Dream, Another Woman's Child, Maricela, Lena: My 100 Children, Whitewash, A Dream is a Wish Your Heart Makes: The Annette Funicello Story, Stolen Memories: Secrets from the Rose Garden, For the Future: The Irvine Fertility Scandal, The Ring, and Best Friends for Life. Lavin produced and starred in A Matter of Life and Death, the 1981 telefilm based on the work of nurse thanatologist Joy Ufema. She directed the 1990 telefilm Flour Babies.

Lavin made her feature film debut in The Muppets Take Manhattan (1984). Her other feature film appearances include See You in the Morning, starring Jeff Bridges; Alain Resnais's I Want to Go Home, opposite Gérard Depardieu (both 1989); and The Back-up Plan (2010).

In 2015, Lavin guest starred as a judge approached to stop an execution in the episode of Bones titled "The Verdict in the Victims." Emily Deschanel said "Lavin was particularly fun to have on" the show.

Lavin played Judy Roberts in the CBS sitcom 9JKL (2017–18) alongside Mark Feuerstein and Elliott Gould. Lavin caught up with Portland Magazine in its Winterguide 2018 issue about her return to CBS stating: 

In 2019, Lavin joined the cast of the Netflix comedy/horror Santa Clarita Diet, starring Drew Barrymore and Timothy Olyphant.

In 2020, Lavin performed the song "The Boy From..." from The Mad Show in Take Me to the World: A Sondheim 90th Birthday Celebration.  Lavin appeared in the CBS comedy B Positive, which aired from 2020 to 2022, in a recurring role as Norma, one of the senior citizens at a local retirement home.

Theatre 
Lavin began her career with Broadway appearances in the musical A Family Affair (1962) and plays such as The Riot Act (1963) and Carl Reiner's Something Different (1967). In his New York Times review of John Guare's two one-act plays, Cop-Out (1969), Clive Barnes wrote: "Miss Lavin...carries versatility almost to the point of paranoia, and camps up a storm."

Lavin also appeared in numerous Off-Broadway productions, including the revue Wet Paint (1965), the musical The Mad Show (1966) (in which she introduced the cabaret standard "The Boy From...", written by Stephen Sondheim and Mary Rodgers), and Little Murders (1969). Lavin won the Theatre World Award for Wet Paint and a Drama Desk Award for Little Murders. In 1975, she appeared in the Shakespeare in the Park (New York City) production of The Comedy of Errors at the Delacorte Theater.

She "arrived at showbiz stardom with a featured role" in the musical It's a Bird...It's a Plane...It's Superman (1966). She received her first Tony Award nomination in 1970, for her role in the Neil Simon play Last of the Red Hot Lovers (1969). Clive Barnes, in his review for The New York Times, wrote: "Linda Lavin, eyebrows, [sic] flaunting like telegraphed messages, mouth twitching and pouting, voice as dry as thunder and with a cough like electric static, is beautiful as Elaine, the sex cat feeling coolly kittenish and looking for a safe tin roof." Lavin's last Broadway credit before she moved to Hollywood was in Paul Sills' Story Theatre in 1971.

In 1984, Lavin played the character of "The Mother" in Luigi Pirandello's Six Characters in Search of an Author in a production directed by Robert Brustein at the American Repertory Theatre in Cambridge, Massachusetts.

After more than a decade away, appearing on television, Lavin returned to the Broadway stage in 1987, winning a Tony Award for Best Actress in a Play and her second Drama Desk Award for her role as Kate in Simon's play Broadway Bound. In his review in The New York Times, Frank Rich wrote: "One only wishes that Ms. Lavin, whose touching performance is of the same high integrity as the writing, could stay in the role forever." Theatre critic Charles McNulty wrote of her performance that it "is widely considered one of the most memorable in contemporary Broadway history, winning not just awards but praise approaching the level of myth. The distinguished theater critic Gordon Rogoff, extolling 'the power available only to an actor at the height of her own command of detail,' went so far as to describe Lavin's portrayal as 'one of those textbook lessons in great acting...' "

She then starred on Broadway in Gypsy as Mama Rose Hovick, replacing Tyne Daly in July 1990. June Havoc saw Lavin's performance in Gypsy and sent Lavin a photo of Havoc's mother, the real Rose Hovick, with a note of appreciation for Lavin's particular portrayal of the character.

Subsequent Broadway roles included The Sisters Rosensweig, as a replacement Gorgeous Teitelbaum starting in September 1993 and Mrs. Van Daan in The Diary of Anne Frank (1997–1998), opposite Natalie Portman, for which she garnered a Tony nomination as Featured Actress in a Play. In 1995 she appeared in the Off-Broadway Death-Defying Acts, which consists of three one-act plays; Lavin performed in the Elaine May ("Hotline") and Woody Allen plays ("Central Park West"). She was nominated for a Drama Desk Award (Outstanding Actress – Play) and won an Obie Award (Performance) and the Lucille Lortel Award. She also directed theater during this period.

She played Marjorie in The Tale of the Allergist's Wife (2000–2001), co-starring Tony Roberts and Michele Lee, for which she was nominated for a Tony Award, Leading Actress in a Play, and Drama Desk Award, and "nanny" for Helen (young Carol Burnett, played by Sara Niemietz and Donna Lynne Champlin) in Hollywood Arms in Chicago and on Broadway in 2002.

In 2010, Lavin appeared as Ruth Steiner in a Broadway revival of the play Collected Stories, reprising her role for a PBS production of the play, and received a fifth Tony nomination for the role. She appeared in the new play by Jon Robin Baitz, Other Desert Cities, Off-Broadway at the Mitzi Newhouse Theater (Lincoln Center) beginning in previews in December 2010, closing February 27, 2011. Lavin was featured in the Kennedy Center (Washington, DC) production of the musical Follies, from May 2011 to June 2011, as Hattie Walker.

She appeared in the premiere of the Nicky Silver play The Lyons at the Off-Broadway Vineyard Theatre, beginning in September 2011, through November 11. Ben Brantley, The New York Times reviewer, commented: "Watching Ms. Lavin, I found myself thinking of Nora from Ibsen's Doll's House – well, a pursed-lipped, lemony-sour, older Nora in pseudo-Chanel, one who's never at a loss for what to say and when to say it. Rita may be a little behind schedule in discovering herself, but no one can fault the hair-trigger timing of the actress playing her or the surprising dimensions she finds within one-liners." She reprised her role in the Broadway production, which opened at the Cort Theatre on April 23, 2012 and closed on July 1, 2012.

Lavin appeared in the new Nicky Silver play Too Much Sun, which opened Off-Broadway at the Vineyard Theatre on May 18, 2014. Ben Brantley, in his review for The New York Times wrote: "And it's an unconditional treat to witness an actress like Ms. Lavin tuned so precisely into the writer's wavelength that script and performance become a marriage of true minds."

Lavin appeared in 2015/16 on Broadway at the Samuel J. Friedman Theatre in a Manhattan Theatre Club production of Richard Greenberg's Our Mother's Brief Affair.

In January 2017, Lavin appeared in New York City Opera's production of Leonard Bernstein's Candide at the Rose Theatre at Lincoln Center in the role of The Old Lady.

In 2020, Lavin performed "The Boy From..." as part of Take Me to the World: A Sondheim 90th Birthday Celebration. Writing in The New York Times, critic Ben Brantley called her performance of the song "deliciously undersold," and noted that she had introduced it 54 years earlier.

Cabaret and recording
Lavin has appeared in cabaret and concert performances. In 2005 she appeared at the Empire Plush Room in San Francisco, accompanied by Billy Stritch and her husband, Steve Bakunas. The Talkin' Broadway reviewer summed up her performance: "Linda Lavin is funny, warm and full of personality." In April 2006 she performed at Birdland (New York) "with her critically acclaimed cabaret act The Song Remembers When", with Billy Stritch. She performed with the Wilmington Symphony (Wilmington, North Carolina) in March 2012.

Her recording Possibilities was released by Ghostlight Records in 2012. Steven Suskin wrote: "There is still that sweet, friendly sound of long ago (and 'sweet' and 'friendly' are not words you'd use to describe Lavin-the-actress)."

Personal life 

Lavin has been married three times. Her first marriage to Ron Leibman ended in divorce in 1981. Her second marriage, to Kip Niven, whom she met on the set of Alice, ended in a bitter divorce in 1992. While Lavin has no biological children, she is the stepmother of the children of her second husband and plays an active role in their lives and also in the lives of her grandchildren. She is also the stepmother of the children of her third and current husband, artist/musician Steve Bakunas, whom she married in 2005. The couple resided in Wilmington, North Carolina, where they were committed community members who were working together to rehabilitate impoverished neighborhoods including renovating many homes, donating a park to the city and creating a community theatre, the Red Barn Studio. In 1997, Lavin founded The Linda Lavin Arts Foundation in Wilmington, "to promote and foster the advancement of the performing and visual arts, with special emphasis on arts in education. Her foundation has created a theatre program called Girl Friends, whose purpose is to raise the self-esteem of at-risk teenage girls of the inner city."

Both of her former husbands, the aforementioned Niven and Leibman, died in 2019 along with Alice co-stars Philip McKeon and Charles Levin.

In Wilmington, she was a stage director. One of her directorial credits was a 1998 production of William Shakespeare's As You Like It, updated to a Brazilian jazz style. In both Wilmington and New York she teaches master classes in acting and singing.

In September 2012, Lavin announced that she intended to sell her home in Wilmington and return to New York City. Lavin and Bakunas had lived in New York City since circa 2013–2014. In July 2016, the Luxury Living website posted Lavin's Central Park South apartment for sale at $1.25 million.

Awards and nominations
Lavin was inducted into the American Theater Hall of Fame for 2010 in January 2011.

Tony Awards
1970 Best Performance by a Featured Actress in a Play – Last of the Red Hot Lovers (Nominated)
1987 Best Performance by a Leading Actress in a Play – Broadway Bound (Won)
1998 Best Performance by a Featured Actress in a Play – The Diary of Anne Frank (Nominated)
2001 Best Performance by a Leading Actress in a Play – The Tale of the Allergist's Wife (Nominated)
2010 Best Performance by a Leading Actress in a Play – Collected Stories (Nominated)
2012 Best Performance by a Leading Actress in a Play – The Lyons (Nominated)

Drama Desk Awards
1987 Outstanding Actress in a Play – Broadway Bound (Won)
2008 Outstanding Featured Actress in a Play – The New Century (Won)

Obie Award
1994–95 Outstanding Actress – Death Defying Acts (Won)
2012 Performance The Lyons (Won)

Golden Globe Awards
1979 Best TV Actress in a Musical or Comedy – Alice (Won)
1980 Best TV Actress in a Musical or Comedy – Alice (Won)
1981 Best TV Actress in a Musical or Comedy – Alice (Nominated)

Primetime Emmy Awards
1979 Outstanding Lead Actress in a Comedy Series – Alice (Nominated)

Work

Filmography

Film

Television

Stage

References

Further reading
Putt, Jr., Barry M. (2019). Alice: Life Behind the Counter in Mel's Greasy Spoon (A Guide to the Feature Film, the TV Series, and More). Albany, Georgia: BearManor Media. .

External links 

 
 
 
 
 
 Linda Lavin biography, as "Alice" cast member

1937 births
American women singers
American film actresses
American musical theatre actresses
American stage actresses
American television actresses
Best Musical or Comedy Actress Golden Globe (television) winners
College of William & Mary alumni
Drama Desk Award winners
Living people
Jewish American actresses
Jewish women singers
Musicians from Portland, Maine
Actresses from Maine
Actors from Wilmington, North Carolina
Tony Award winners
20th-century American actresses
21st-century American actresses
Actresses from Portland, Maine
Waynflete School alumni
American people of Russian-Jewish descent